Tashtyube (Taştübä) is a rural locality (a village) in Tashlinsky Selsoviet, Alsheyevsky District, Bashkortostan, Russia. The population was 191 as of 2010. There are 3 streets.

Geography 
Tashtyube is located 24 km northwest of Rayevsky (the district's administrative centre) by road. Bayazitovo is the nearest rural locality.

References 

Rural localities in Alsheyevsky District